is a train station in Chūō-ku, Kobe, Hyōgo Prefecture, Japan.

Lines
Kobe Municipal Subway
Kaigan Line Station K02

Layout
The station has an island platform which serves two tracks.

Railway stations in Hyōgo Prefecture
Railway stations in Japan opened in 2001